South African Express Airways SOC Ltd, known as South African Express or simply SA Express, was a state-owned airline based in South Africa that started operations on 24 April 1994.  Although the airline was operationally independent of South African Airways, its flights were incorporated within the strategic alliance with South African Airways.  The airline had its head office at Airways Park, Jones Road, next to O.R. Tambo International Airport in Kempton Park, Ekurhuleni, Gauteng.

History

On 24 May 2018 the South African Civil Aviation Authority grounded the airline due to "serious safety risks". They reported it could be months before the airline was operational again. Flights resumed on 23 August, following the issuance of airworthiness certificates for a portion of the airline's fleet.

On 13 February 2020, South African Express entered the Business Rescue process, a local form of bankruptcy protection. On 18 March 2020, the airline suspended all operations due to the COVID-19 pandemic. On 28 April 2020, the business rescue practitioners submitted an application to the Pretoria High Court for the liquidation of the airline. The court approved a provisional liquidation, with stakeholders being given until 9 June 2020 to voice objections before a final dissolution of the company.

In November 2020, the moveable assets of the company such as the eight Bombardier's, spare parts and furniture were to be sold via an online auction managed by GoIndustry DoveBid Africa. The non-moveable assets such as the routes, landing rights and existing licences would be sold to FlySax, a consortium consisting of a key investor and ex-SA Express staff.

Corporate affairs

Ownership
The holding company is South African Airline Holdings (Proprietary) Limited, which is wholly owned by the Government of South Africa.

Business trends
South African Express is loss-making, and its accounts have been qualified by the auditors since 2012/13; the 2016/17 accounts remain unaudited (as at July 2019) and have been subject to parliamentary questions. Figures that had been made available were disputed, and the previously published accounts were withdrawn in November 2011 after accounting errors that dated back several years were discovered. Some fuller reports have been published since then, although figures are frequently restated in the following year's Report. Available figures (for years ending 31 March) are:

Notes: Profitability figures for 2008/09 are not shown above(*), as they are believed to have been restated since the publication of the Annual Report. Revised figures for 2010/11 are from press reports in April 2013; the financial statements for 2012/13, 2013/14, 2014/15 and 2015/16 were audited, but received a qualified audit opinion.

Destinations
South African Express served the following destinations (as of January 2020): All flights had been suspended by 18 April 2020.

 Gaborone – Sir Seretse Khama International Airport

 Lubumbashi – Lubumbashi International Airport

 Walvis Bay – Walvis Bay International Airport

 Bloemfontein – Bram Fischer International Airport 
 Cape Town – Cape Town International Airport
 Durban – King Shaka International Airport
 Hoedspruit – Eastgate Airport
 Johannesburg – O.R. Tambo International Airport Hub
 Kimberley – Kimberley Airport  
 Port Elizabeth - Port Elizabeth International Airport

Fleet

Current fleet
The South African Express fleet consisted of the following aircraft :

Historical fleet
The airline fleet previously included the following aircraft:

 Bombardier Q300

See also
 South African Airways
 Congo Express

References

External links 

 
South African Express Airways fleet

Defunct airlines of South Africa
Airlines established in 1994
Airlines disestablished in 2020
South African companies established in 1994
2020 disestablishments in South Africa
Government-owned airlines
South African brands
Aviation safety
Government-owned companies of South Africa
Companies based in Ekurhuleni
Kempton Park, Gauteng